Dubravka Šuica (born 20 May 1957) is a Croatian politician of the liberal Croatian Democratic Union (HDZ) who has been Vice-President of the European Commission for Democracy and Demography since 2019. She previously served as a member of the European Parliament from 2013 to 2019.

She served two consecutive terms as mayor of Dubrovnik between 2001 and 2009. She was the first female mayor of Dubrovnik and one of the first female mayors of major Croatian cities in modern Croatia. She served as a member of the Croatian Parliament in three terms from 2001 to 2011. Since 2004, she has been elected five times in a row as Vice-President of the Congress of Local and Regional Authorities of the Council of Europe. In October 2012, she was elected Vice-President of the EPP Women's association and in June 2019 Vice-President of the EPP's EU parliament group.

Biography
Dubravka Šuica was born  in Dubrovnik, Croatia. She graduated from the Zagreb Faculty of Humanities and Social Sciences in 1981, majoring in English and literature and German language. 

Before her political career, Dubravka Šuica worked for 20 years as a high school teacher, university professor and principal in Dubrovnik. She became active in politics in 1990, joining Croatian Democratic Union (HDZ) before the first democratic elections in Croatia. Since 1998, she served as head of HDZ Dubrovnik branch up until 2014.

In 2001, Šuica was elected as first ever female mayor of Dubrovnik. She was re-elected in 2005 and served as the mayor till 2009. 

She was elected as the member of Croatian Parliament three times, in the 2000, 2003 and 2007 parliamentary elections. She held several positions in Croatian Parliament Committees. She was Chairwoman of the Committee, Family, Youth and Sports (2000–2003) and also Vice-Chairwoman of the Committee on European Affairs during Croatia's accession period (2007–2011).

In 2004, Dubravka Šuica was elected one of the vice-presidents of the Congress of Local and Regional Authorities of the Council of Europe. She was reelected to that position in 2006, 2008, 2010, and 2012.

In May 2012, Dubravka Šuica was elected vice-president of the HDZ at the national level. She was also the president of the Foreign and European Affairs Committee of HDZ.

In October 2012, she was elected vice-president of EPP Women and she still holds this position. 

In the 2013 European election, Dubravka Šuica was elected Member of the European Parliament. She was sworn in on 1 July 2013, after Croatia joined the European Union. She was re-elected MEP following the 2014 European election, placing 2nd on the HDZ list. She served as one of the deputy chairs of the EP's Delegation for relations with Bosnia and Herzegovina, and Kosovo (DSEE), as well as taking part in various committees such as  ENVI, AFET where she served as Vice-President from 2016 to 2019, TRAN, FEMM and the Delegation for relations with the United States (D-US). 

Dubravka Šuica was re-elected MEP at the 2019 election, for the third consecutive time.

In June 2019, she was elected as first Vice-President of the European People's Party (EPP) in the European Parliament. From 2013 to 2019, she was also head of the Croatian EPP delegation in the Parliament.

In August 2019, Dubravka Šuica was nominated as a candidate for European Commissioner from Croatia, and on 10 July 2019 President-elect Ursula von der Leyen assigned her the role of Vice-President designate for Democracy and Demography. As of 1 December 2019, she is Vice President of the European Commission for Democracy and Demography.

On 1 June 2022, Dubravka Šuica was elected as Vice-President of the European People's Party.

References

External links
European Parliament MEP profile
World Mayor profile
Profile at the Croatian Parliament website 
* Personal webpage

1957 births
Congress of the Council of Europe
Croatian Democratic Union MEPs
Croatian Democratic Union politicians
Croatian educators
Croatian women educators
Croatian European Commissioners
Faculty of Humanities and Social Sciences, University of Zagreb alumni
Living people
Mayors of Dubrovnik
MEPs for Croatia 2013–2014
MEPs for Croatia 2014–2019
MEPs for Croatia 2019–2024
Representatives in the modern Croatian Parliament
Women European Commissioners
Women mayors of places in Croatia
Women MEPs for Croatia
European Commissioners 2019–2024